The Caudron C.880 was a high-wing monoplane of all-metal construction, observation/artillery liaison aircraft built by Caudron in the early 1940s.

Specifications

References

C.880
Single-engined tractor aircraft
High-wing aircraft
Aircraft first flown in 1940